Søllested was the administrative centre of the former Højreby Municipality in Denmark. Since 1 January 2007, it has been a part of the new Lolland Municipality. The town lies 9 km east of Nakskov. Søllested has a population of 1,345 (1 January 2022).

Notable people 
 Peter Erasmus Christian Kaalund (1844 in Søllested – 1919) a Danish philologist who specialized in Scandinavian studies
 Torben Tryde (1916 – 1998 in Søllested) a Danish lieutenant colonel, writer, Olympian, resistance fighter and the last person to be appointed kammerjunker by the Danish Court.
 Poul Popiel (born 1943 in Søllested) a Danish-American former professional ice hockey defenceman

References

Cities and towns in Region Zealand
Lolland
Lolland Municipality